Korea Investment Corporation (KIC) is a sovereign wealth fund established by the government of South Korea in 2005. Its mission is to preserve and enhance the long-term purchasing power of South Korea's sovereign wealth (foreign reserves) through efficient management of public funds in the international financial markets. KIC manages assets entrusted by the Government, the Bank of Korea, and other public funds as defined under the National Finance Act. KIC directly invests the entrusted assets or re-entrusts the assets to external managers. KIC's Total assets under management stood at US$131.6 billion at the end of the fourth quarter of 2018.

Vision
To be a top sovereign wealth fund that serves as a cornerstone for the nation's economic future through increasing national wealth

Mission
Increase national wealth by maximizing risk-adjusted returns
Contribute to the development of Korea's financial industry

Governance
Steering Committee

The Steering Committee deliberates and resolves the following matters (Article 9 of the KIC Act), including: mid- and long-term investment policies; modification of financial status, such as the increase or decrease of capital; entrustment of assets to KIC; appointment and dismissal of executive officers; approval of budget and account settlement; evaluation of management performance of KIC; inspection of the business. The Investment Sub-Committee and Risk Management Sub-Committee support the matters related to mid- and long-term investment policies of the Steering Committee. Furthermore, the Budget Deliberation Sub-Committee and the Evaluation & Compensation Sub-Committee deliberate on issues pertaining to the operation of KIC and performance evaluation.

Committee members include six professionals from the private sector and the three official members who are the representatives of institutions that have entrusted assets exceeding a set amount, namely the Minister of Strategy and Finance, the Governor of the Bank of Korea and the CEO of KIC. The six private sector members, who are nominated by the Civil Member Candidate Nomination Committee and appointed by the President of the Republic of Korea, serve two-year terms. The chairman of the Steering Committee is elected from among the civil members.

Board of Directors

KIC maintains a Board of Directors which includes CEO and directors. The Board resolves important issues to be referred to the Steering Committee; use of emergency funds and carrying forward of the budget; matters pertaining to the adoption, amendment to and repeal of internal regulations of KIC; and any other matters of the Board deems necessary.

Chief Executive Officer(CEO)

CEO of KIC is appointed by the President of the Republic of Korea upon recommendation by the Minister of Strategy and Finance through the President Recommendation Committee, and deliberation by the Steering Committee. The CEO represents KIC and presides over its business, and convenes the meetings of the Board of Directors and serves as the chairman of such meetings.

Statutory Auditor

In accordance with the Korea Investment Corporation Act, KIC has an independent audit function separate from the management. The full-time Statutory Auditor is appointed by the Minister of Strategy and Finance through deliberation by the Steering Committee. Its role and responsibilities are to audit business and accounting activities at KIC.

Directors

Directors are appointed and dismissed by the CEO following deliberation by the Steering Committee. Appointed directors serve three-year terms.

Investment
Asset Allocation(2018 4Q)

Traditional Investments
The traditional asset portfolio pursues stable risk-adjusted returns by investing in publicly traded securities, mostly stocks and bonds.
 
The global financial crisis of 2008, the U.S. credit rating downgrade in 2011, and the fiscal crisis in Europe temporarily dampened returns on traditional assets. Nevertheless, the traditional asset portfolio delivered a return of 11.83% in 2012, outperforming the benchmark by 66bp, amid global policy collaboration to revive the world economy. The cumulative return over the past five years is 3.72%(annualized ), which is 3bp higher than the benchmark.

Alternative Investments
Alternative investments have a different risk/return profile compared with traditional asset classes. KIC invests in alternative assets as a way of complementing investment in traditional assets. Alternative investments usually comprise assets that have low liquidity and are based on private contracts.
KIC began investing in private equity and real estate/infrastructure in 2009, and expanded the scope of investment to hedge funds in early 2010. In 2012, KIC expended and diversified investment in alternative assets to pursue consistent and stable returns.

Special Investments
KIC has been allocating assets to a wide range of sectors since launching special investments in 2010. KIC maintains appropriate risk management and monitoring systems to ensure stability of the special investment portfolio. Special investments are managed internally rather than outsourced and also pursued in partnership with other sovereign wealth funds and prominent global pension funds.

Milestones
Year 2005
March: Promulgation of Korea Investment Corporation Act
July: Establishment of Korea Investment Corporation

Year 2006
June: Signing of investment management agreement with the Bank of Korea
October: Signing of investment management agreement with the Ministry of Strategy and Finance

Year 2007
April: Launch of global equity investment
August: Launch of In-house global fixed income investment

Year 2008
March: Launch of In-house global equity investment

Year 2009
March: Expansion of Risk Management team
August: Launch of alternative investment team

Year 2010
March: Formation of Special Investment Team
July: Opening of New York Office

Year 2011
December: Opening of London Office
December: Adoption of the Long-term growth strategy 'Vision 2020'

Year 2012
SEP 2012:Launch of Direct investment in mainland China

Year 2017
September: Opening of Singapore Office

See also
 The Ministry of Finance and Strategy
 The Bank of Korea

References

External links 
 Korea Investment Corporation

Sovereign wealth funds
Finance in South Korea